The 1914 Alabama Crimson Tide football team (variously "Alabama", "UA" or "Bama") represented the University of Alabama in the 1914 college football season. It was the Crimson Tide's 22nd overall and 19th season as a member of the Southern Intercollegiate Athletic Association (SIAA). The team was led by head coach D. V. Graves, in his fourth year, and played their home games at the University of Alabama Quad in Tuscaloosa and at Rickwood Field in Birmingham, Alabama. They finished the season with a record of five wins and four losses (5–4 overall, 3–3 in the SIAA).

Game summaries

Before the Tennessee game, Alabama quarterback Charlie Joplin was ruled ineligible after he refused to sign an affidavit that he had never played professional baseball. Alabama went 3–0 with Joplin and 2–4 after he left the team. The loss to Tennessee at Knoxville would be the last time the two teams met until 1928. They then closed the season with a loss against the Carlisle Indian Industrial School Indians led by future College Football Hall of Fame head coach Pop Warner.

Schedule

References
General

 

Specific

Alabama
Alabama Crimson Tide football seasons
Alabama Crimson Tide football